Asansol is a (Tier-II) metropolitan city in the Indian state of West Bengal. It is the second largest and second most populated city of West Bengal and the 33rd largest urban agglomeration in India. Asansol is the district headquarters of Paschim Bardhaman district. According to a 2010 report released by the International Institute for Environment and Development, a UK-based policy research non-governmental body, Asansol was ranked 11th among Indian cities and 42nd in the world in its list of 100 fastest-growing cities. Asansol is classed as a Y-category city for calculation of HRA (House Rent Allowance) for public servants, is rate 16%, making it a Tier-II city.

Etymology
"Asan", a species of tree which generally grows thirty meters tall, is found on the banks of the Damodar River; "sol" refers to land. The name "Asansol" is a combination of these two words. Asansol is a city on the banks of Damodar and its land is rich in minerals.

Historically the city was anglicized as Assensole during the British era but the name was reverted after Independence.

History
The region is believed to have been a part of the kingdom of Vishnupur where the Malla dynasty ruled for approximately a thousand years till the emergence of the British. This theory is backed by the presence of Vishnupur style temple present at Chhotodighari village and Domohani village in Asansol.

Geography

Overview
Asansol is a cosmopolitan city located on the lower Chota Nagpur Plateau, which occupies most of Jharkhand, between the Damodar and Ajay rivers. Another river, the Barakar, joins the Damodar near Dishergarh. Two small rivulets, Nunia and Garui flows past Asansol.

While Dhanbad district in Jharkhand lies on the western side, Durgapur subdivision lies on the eastern side. To the south, across the Damodar river are the Purulia and Bankura districts. To the north are Dumka and Birbhum districts. Dhanbad district is a major coal mining area and has close links with Asansol; both lie in the Damodar valley.

The city is connected by the Grand Trunk Road and by rail with Durgapur, Burdwan, and Kolkata. It is an important coal-trading and railway centre, with large railway workshops and a railway colony.

Police stations
Asansol North police station has jurisdiction over Raniganj CD Block and parts of Asansol Municipal Corporation. The area covered is 50 km2 and the population covered is 410,000 (2001).

Asansol South police station has jurisdiction over parts of Asansol municipal corporation. The area covered is 69 km2 and the population covered is 475,439 (2001).

Asansol Women PS covers both Asansol and Durgapur subdivisions.	

Raniganj, Jamuria, Hirapur and Kulti police stations also serve parts of Asansol municipal corporation area.

According to the Kolkata Gazette notification of 3 June 2015, the municipal areas of Kulti, Raniganj and Jamuria were included within the jurisdiction of Asansol Municipal Corporation.

Administration

Asansol is administered by the Asansol Municipal Corporation. In 1850, a union committee was formed to look after the civic needs of Asansol. The Assensole (now Asansol) Municipality was approved in 1885 but started functioning effectively in 1896. It was upgraded to the status of a corporation in 1994. Since 2011 it has had its own Police Commissionerate.
In 2015, Kulti, Jamuria and Raniganj Municipalities were dissolved and now these areas are administered by the Asansol Municipal Corporation. Thus the proper city limits of Asansol includes the old Asansol Area, including Burnpur, as well as other prominent locations like Raniganj, Chinakuri, Mithani, Barakar, Kulti, Dishergarh, Neamatpur, Sitarampur and Jamuria. Asansol Municipal Corporation has 106 wards.

Asansol-Durgapur Development Authority (ADDA) was established in April 1980 by the merger of the Asansol Planning Organisation and the Durgapur Development Authority. Jurisdiction of ADDA covers the areas administered by Asansol Municipal Corporation, the Jamuria Panchayet Samiti, the Community Development Blocks of Andal, Pandabeswar and Durgapur-Faridpur, Durgapur Municipal Corporation and a small part of Kanksa Community Development Block.

Climate
Asansol has hot and dry summers and mild winters. In summers temperatures soar above 45 °C with dry hot air blowing known as 'loo' while in winter temperatures go below 10 °C. Monsoon lasts from June to September.
The Köppen Climate Classification sub-type for this climate is "Aw" (Tropical Savanna Climate).

Demographics

As per the 2011 census, the total population of Asansol is 1,243,414 out of which 646,052 are males and 597,362 are females. The city has a literacy rate of 83.30%. The major religions in Asansol are Hinduism, followed by 75.18% of the population, and Islam, followed by 21.26% of the population. 1.09% of the populace are adherents of Sikhism, while 0.99% of the population adheres to Christianity.

*For language details see Salanpur (community development block)#Language and religion

Transport

Road

The Grand Trunk Road (NH 19 - old numbering NH 2) runs across the subdivision and NH 14 (old numbering NH 60) connects Asansol with Odisha. NH 19 has been broadened as part of the Golden Quadrilateral project and now allows three-lane traffic in both directions. A highway bypass avoids the areas of Ushagram, Murgasol, Asansol Bazar, Chelidanga, BNR, Gopalpur, Neamatpur, Kulti, and Barakar. Some of the other important roads of the city are namely Vivekananda Avenue, Burnpur Road, and S.B Gorai Road.

The South Bengal State Transport Corporation operates daily bus services to Kolkata and numerous other destinations, such as Malda, Siliguri, Midnapur, Bankura, Siuri, Purulia, Burdwan, Kalna, Howrah, Barackpore, Digha, Bolpur, Kirnahar and Berhampore. The North Bengal State Transport Corporation also runs services to and from the city and towns in North Bengal like Malda, Raiganj and Balurghat. There are also many private buses, Taxis and Radio Taxis, which ply locally and on intercity and interstate routes.

Railway

Asansol Junction railway station is the Division of Eastern Railway zone This is one of the oldest divisions on the Indian Railways and has always been in the forefront of operations, both freight and passenger. As far as Eastern Railway is concerned, Asansol Division is referred to as the heart of operations, being at the crossroads of the Grand Chord route via Gaya and the main line route via Patna. With a total of 629.38 route kilometers, the division has the unique distinction of having quadruple lines (two up and two down line) from Khana to Sitarampur.

The railway track from Kolkata to Delhi passes through the subdivision and bifurcates into the main line and the grand chord line at Sitarampur railway junction, a little to the west of Asansol railway junction. Another railway track links Asansol with Adra and then to Jamshedpur via Purulia and Kharagpur via Bankura. A branch line connects Andal with Sainthia on the Sahibganj Loop.

Almost all the trains linking Kolkata with north India also connect with Asansol including Sealdah Rajdhani, Howrah Rajdhani, Howrah Duronto, Sealdah Humsafar Express, Yuva Express and Shalimar Duronto. As a result, Asansol enjoys good connectivity with cities like New Delhi, Jammu, Amritsar, Ludhiana, Allahabad, Kanpur, Lucknow, Dehradun, Jaipur, Kota, Jodhpur, Jaisalmer, Gwalior, Bhopal, Indore, Patna, Ranchi and Dhanbad on the one hand and commands a fairly good traffic movement towards the western cities like Mumbai, Ahmedabad and Surat and southern cities like Bhubaneshwar, Visakhapatnam, Vijaywada, Chennai, Bangalore and Trivandrum. It is also connected with Guwahati in the north-east region.

Air
The domestic airport that serves the city is Kazi Nazrul Islam Airport. The airport is located in Andal.

There is also a private airport located at Burnpur Riverside Area. At present this Airport is operated by IISCO. Recently Airport Authority of India gave nod to start commercial flights for six routes in West Bengal; Burnpur Airport being one of them is hopeful to receive its first commercial flight by the last quarter of 2019.

The nearest international airport is Netaji Subhas Chandra Bose International Airport at Dum Dum in Kolkata.

Economy

The economy of Asansol is primarily dependent on its steel and coal industries, railways, and its trade and commerce.

Steel

The Steel Authority of India IISCO (Indian Iron and Steel Company Ltd) steel-making plant at Kulti was the first such facility in India. It became well known during the 1960s and 1970s, with its company shares being traded on the London Stock Exchange. However, a decade later the company became loss-making until it was revived in 2006 when it merged with the Steel Authority of India. Modernisation at IISCO Steel Plant has helped the city develop at a very rapid pace. The plant's capacity will be raised from 0.4 MT to 2.5 MT of saleable steel, using what will be the biggest blast furnace in the country. As of 2015, the investment for modernization was the single largest investment in West Bengal till then.

Coal
Eastern Coalfields, which has its headquarters in Sanctoria P.O. - Dishergarh, has a significant presence in the area due to the huge deposits of high-quality coal. However, most of the coalfields and surrounding residential colonies are located away from the main city. Nearby areas like Raniganj, Chinakuri, and Jamuria are of particular importance as coal blocks. As of 2012, the total coal reserve in the ECL command area up to 600 metre depth was 49.17 billion tonnes.

Railways
Railways also is a big contributor to the economy of Asansol. Railways were the first employer in the city and they are credited with developing the city in the late 19th century. Asansol is one of four divisions of Eastern Railway Zone and among the major revenue generating divisions in Indian Railways. World's largest vertically integrated organisation Chittaranjan Locomotive Works under Indian Railways is also situated here. It is India's first locomotive works and Asia's largest Locomotive manufacturer.

Other business ventures
Other industries include Dishergarh Power Supply, Damodar Valley Corporation, Burn Standard Co. which is now a subsidiary of Eastern Railways, Hindustan Cables Limited and cement factories like Burnpur Cement.

Education

Among the many educational institutions are:

Schools
 Asansol Ramakrishna Mission High School
 Assembly of God Church School
 Green Point Academy
 Burnpur Riverside School 
 DAV Public School, Asansol
 Domohani Kelejora High School
 Loreto Convent
 St. Patrick's Higher Secondary School
 St. Vincent's High and Technical School
 Subhaspally Bidyaniketan
 City Montessori High School
 Eastern Railway High school
 Asansol North Point School
 Kendriya Vidyalaya Asansol
 Calcutta Boys' and Girls' School
 Narayana School

Colleges/Universities
 Asansol Engineering College
 Asansol Girls' College
 Asansol Polytechnic 
 Banwarilal Bhalotia College, Asansol
 Bidhan Chandra College, Asansol
 Deshbandhu Mahavidyalaya
 Kanyapur Polytechnic
 Kazi Nazrul Islam Mahavidyalaya
 Kazi Nazrul University
 Khandra College
 Kulti College
 Raniganj Girls' College
 St. Xavier's College, Asansol
 Triveni Devi Bhalotia College

Libraries

There are several public libraries, including the District Library.

Media
Prasar Bharati has a High Power Transmitter Station at Asansol which broadcasts Doordarshan National / Bangla and Doordarshan News Channel. Transmissions are not only received by the city but also neighbouring places. Other than national channels, several local channels are available through cable TV networks, such as Vision 24, Drishti Channel, ATV, and ISP Channel.

Asansol currently has four FM radio stations: All India Radio 100.3 FM, 92.7 BIG FM, 93.5 RED FM and Radio Mirchi 95 FM.

Sports facilities

 The Polo Ground has been a landmark in Asansol for a long time. The ground got its name from the sport of polo which was played here during British rule. Asansol Indoor Stadium is on the same site and has a capacity of 500 spectators. The stadium, which is notable for having the largest shell concrete roof in the district, has two badminton courts and an interchangeable volleyball court. Adjacent to this is Asansol Stadium, where both district and subdivision level football and cricket matches are played.
 Eastern Railway Divisional Stadium, popularly known as the Loco Ground, houses several district and subdivision level football and cricket tournaments.
 The Burnpur Football Stadium is a centre of extensive sports activities. Players groomed in the SAIL Football Academy at Burnpur have represented SAIL in the Kolkata IFA and 1st Division League matches.
 Burnpur Cricket Club Ground is a first-class level cricket stadium located at Burnpur.
 Kazi Nazrul Islam Krirangan is being developed as an international standard stadium at the former Sen Raleigh Football Ground.

Notable people

 Kazi Nazrul Islam
 Sharmila Tagore
 Timir Biswas
 Arjun Atwal
 Vivek Singh (chef)
 S. S. Ahluwalia
 Ajitesh Bandopadhyay
 Manoj Kumar Mukherjee
 Ritwik Das

See also
 List of cities in West Bengal
 Asansol Sadar subdivision
 Asansol Municipal Corporation
 Asansol Junction

References

Further reading
 History of The Indian Iron and Steel Co. Ltd. by Dr. N.R.Srinivasan
 Bardhaman Jelar Itihas O Lok Sanskriti (History and Folk-lore of Bardhaman District) in Bengali by Akkari Chattopadhyay

External links

 Bardhaman District official site
 
 Asansol - The land of black diamond

 
Metropolitan cities in India
Cities and towns in Paschim Bardhaman district
Cities in West Bengal